The following is a list of districts located within the London Borough of Hackney

Dalston
De Beauvoir Town 
Finsbury Park
Hackney
Hackney Central
Hackney Downs
Hackney Marshes
Hackney Wick
Haggerston
Homerton
Hoxton
Kingsland
Lea Bridge
London Fields
Lower Clapton
Manor House
Newington Green
Shacklewell
Shoreditch
South Hackney
Stamford Hill
Stoke Newington
Upper Clapton
West Hackney

Postcode districts 
Postcodes were assigned to the former parts of the borough in 1857/8. Most of the borough would originally have been covered by a northeastern (NE) postal area, but this was abolished in 1866. The majority of the borough is covered by the eastern postal area, but Shoreditch benefits from five separate postcode districts; and areas to the west of Kingsland Road and in the north of the borough are predominantly covered by the northern postal area.

Postcode districts include EC1, EC2, E1, E2, E5, E8, E9, E10, N1, N4, N5, and  N16.

See also 
Hackney parks and open spaces

Lists of places in London